The 2012 Season is the 136th season of competitive soccer in Canada under the association rules.

National teams 

The home team or the team that is designated as the home team is listed in the left column; the away team is in the right column.

Men

Senior

Under-23

Under-20

Under-17

Women

Senior 

2012 Olympic Qualifying Tournament

Friendlies

Managerial changes

League tables

Men

Major League Soccer

North American Soccer League

Canadian Soccer League

Premier Development League 

In 2012 there were nine Canadian teams playing in the US-based USL PDL:
 Victoria Highlanders
 Vancouver Whitecaps FC U-23
 Abbotsford Mariners
 WSA Winnipeg
 Thunder Bay Chill
 Forest City London
 Hamilton Rage
 Toronto Lynx
 Ottawa Fury

Women

W-League 
For details on Canadian W-League teams' year, please refer to 2012 W-League season.

Canadian clubs in international competitions

Toronto FC
2011–12 edition

References 

 
Seasons in Canadian soccer